Jacques Bouchard,  (August 29, 1930 – May 29, 2006) was a Canadian advertising executive and author. He was one of the founders of Quebec's first French creative advertising agency, BCP, and a pioneer in French-language advertising.

He is mostly known for having written Les 36 cordes sensibles des Québécois, a book where he identifies thirty-six cultural traits of the Québécois which may be used in advertisement. He also co-founded advertising agency BCP in 1959, from which he retired in 1984 after passing on presidency to Yves Gougoux.

In 1999, he was made a Member of the Order of Canada. In 2002, he was made a Knight (Chevalier) of the National Order of Quebec.

Bouchard died of cancer on May 29, 2006. Following his death, his wife Caroline Bouchard established the Foundation Jacques-Bouchard, which assists severely ill patients spend their last days at home.

References

External links
 BCP biography
 Obituary 

1930 births
2006 deaths
Businesspeople from Montreal
Knights of the National Order of Quebec
Members of the Order of Canada